Fahad Al-Abdulrahman (Arabic: فهد العبد الرحمن; born 6 April 1995) is a Qatari football left-back for Al-Arabi and for the Qatar national under-19 football team.

Club career

Early career
Abdulrahman started his youth football career at Aspire Academy. In November 2013, he moved to Belgium side K.A.S. Eupen reserve team.

Al Sadd SC
On 1 July 2014, Abdulrahman joined the senior team of Qatari club Al Sadd SC.

K.A.S. Eupen (loan)
On 2 July 2014, Abdulrahman was loaned to K.A.S. Eupen in Belgian Second Division. He made his league debut against R.A.E.C. Mons on 30 November 2014.
In July 2015, his loan was expended for a one season. in this season he played 16 games as defender and contributed to his team's promotion to Belgian First Division A. On 21 June 2016, K.A.S. Eupen announced that Fahad Al-Abdulrahman stays with K.A.S. Eupen for one season.

International career
Fahad has represented his country at various age groups. He was a member of Qatar national under-19 football team for 2014 AFC U-19 Championship, and he won the championship. He played in 2015 FIFA U-20 World Cup as Qatar national under-20 football team.

Club career statistics 

1Other tournaments include Belgian Second Division play-offs

Honours 
Qatar U19
Winner
 AFC U-19 Championship: 2014

References

1995 births
Living people
Qatari footballers
K.A.S. Eupen players
Al Sadd SC players
Al Ahli SC (Doha) players
Al Kharaitiyat SC players
Al-Arabi SC (Qatar) players
Qatari expatriate footballers
Expatriate footballers in Germany
Expatriate footballers in Belgium
Qatari expatriate sportspeople in Germany
Qatari expatriate sportspeople in Belgium
Association football defenders
Aspire Academy (Qatar) players
Qatar Stars League players
Fortuna Düsseldorf players
Qatar international footballers
Qatar under-20 international footballers
Qatar youth international footballers